Gabrielle Bertrand (May 15, 1923 – September 10, 1999) was a Canadian politician.

Born Gabrielle Giroux in Sweetsburg, Quebec (now Cowansville), the daughter of Louis-Arthur Giroux and Juliette Bolduc, she married Jean-Jacques Bertrand in 1944, the future Union Nationale Premier of Quebec from 1968 to 1970. She was the mother of Jean-François Bertrand, a Quebec cabinet minister in the cabinet of René Lévesque.

In the 1984 election, she was elected to the House of Commons of Canada in the riding of Brome—Missisquoi. A Progressive Conservative, she was re-elected in the 1988 election. From 1984 to 1986, she was the Parliamentary Secretary to the Minister of National Health and Welfare. From 1986 to 1987, she was the Parliamentary Secretary to the Minister of Consumer and Corporate Affairs.

The Bibliothèque Gabrielle-Giroux-Bertrand in Cowansville is named in her honour.

Electoral record (partial)

External links
 
 

1923 births
1999 deaths
Members of the House of Commons of Canada from Quebec
People from Cowansville
Progressive Conservative Party of Canada MPs
Women members of the House of Commons of Canada
Women in Quebec politics
20th-century Canadian women politicians